Tin Pahar is a census town in the  Rajmahal CD block in the Sahibganj subdivision of the Sahibganj district in the Indian state of Jharkhand.

Geography

Location

Overview
Rajmahal coalfield is shown in the map. The entire area is overwhelmingly rural with only small pockets of urbanisation.

Note: The full screen map is interesting. All places marked on the map are linked and you can easily move on to another page of your choice. Enlarge the map to see what else is there – one gets railway links, many more road links and so on.

Demographics
According to the 2011 Census of India, Tin Pahar had a total population of 5,336, of which 2,789 (52%) were males and 2,547 (48%) were females. Population in the age range 0–6 years was 840. The total number of literate persons in Tin Pahar was 4,496 (78.94% of the population over 6 years).

Infrastructure
According to the District Census Handbook 2011, Sahibganj, Tin Pahar covered an area of 1.00 km2. Among the civic amenities, it had 8 km roads with open drains, the protected water supply involved hand pump, uncovered well. It had 735 domestic electric connections. Among the educational facilities it had 2 primary schools, 2 middle schools, 2 secondary schools, 2 senior secondary schools. Among the social, cultural and recreational facilities, it had 1 auditorium/ community hall. Two important commodities it produced were stone, cotton. It had the branch office of 1 nationalised bank.

Transport
Tinpahar Junction railway station is situated at Tin Pahar on the Sahibganj loop.

Education
Government Urdu Girls High School is an Urdu medium girls only institution established in 1929. It has facilities for teaching from class I to class X. (The school is marked as Hindi-medium but the name itself suggests that it is Urdu-medium.)

Government High School is a Hindi-medium coeducational institution established in 1967. It has facilities for teaching in classes IX and X.

Tin Pahar Inter College is a Hindi-medium coeducational institution established in 1985. It has facilities for teaching in classes XI and XII.

References

Cities and towns in Sahibganj district